Widett Circle is a locale in Boston, Massachusetts that had long been used as a wholesale food market, but which has been proposed for several redevelopment projects. It is located between a bend in Interstate 93 and the MBTA rail yards, near the Massachusetts Avenue connector to I-93. 
Widett Circle was named for Harold Widett who was the attorney for the meat packers union. 

Potential uses for the site have included:
an additional rail layover for the Massachusetts Bay Transportation Authority (MBTA)
a trash recycling and transfer facility
a new 28,000-seat stadium for the New England Revolution soccer team, though the team's owners are reportedly focusing on a parcel just north of the circle.
a floodable watershed 

In December 2022, the MBTA Board authorized the agency to negotiate to purchase the property for use as a layover yard. The purchase price is expected to be around $200 million, with construction expected to take three years. The new yard will likely include provisions for building an air rights project in the future and may reduce the need for layover facility at the former Beacon Park Yard in Alston.

References

South Boston
MBTA Commuter Rail